Hamdou Mohamed Elhouni (born 2 February 1994) is a Libyan professional footballer who plays for Tunisian club Espérance de Tunis and the Libya national team as a left winger.

He has previously played for Primeira Liga club's Victória Setúbal, Santa Clara, Benfica, Chaves and Aves.

International career

International goals
Scores and results list Libya's goal tally first.

Honours
Aves
Taça de Portugal: 2017–18

References

External links
 
 Profile at FPF (archived)
 
 

1994 births
Living people
People from Tripoli, Libya
Libyan footballers
Association football forwards
Al-Ahli SC (Tripoli) players
Libyan expatriate footballers
Libyan expatriate sportspeople in Portugal
Libyan expatriate sportspeople in Tunisia
Libyan expatriate sportspeople
Expatriate footballers in Portugal
Expatriate footballers in Tunisia
Vitória F.C. players
C.D. Santa Clara players
Liga Portugal 2 players
S.L. Benfica footballers
G.D. Chaves players
C.D. Aves players
Espérance Sportive de Tunis players
Primeira Liga players
Tunisian Ligue Professionnelle 1 players
Libya international footballers
Libyan Premier League players